The Central District of Ramsar County is a district (bakhsh) in Ramsar County, Mazandaran Province, Iran. At the 2006 census, its population was 67,675, in 19,666 families.  The District has two cities: Ramsar and Ketalem and Sadat Shahr. The District has four rural districts (dehestan): Chehel Shahid Rural District, Eshkevar Rural District, Jennat Rudbar Rural District, and Sakht Sar Rural District.

References 

Ramsar County
Districts of Mazandaran Province